Lucien Lesna (11 October 1863 – 11 July 1932) was a French racing cyclist. He won the 1901 and 1902 Paris–Roubaix races.

References

External links

1863 births
1932 deaths
French male cyclists
People from Le Locle